Worcestershire Medal Service, Ltd., established in 1988, is a manufacturer of State honours and insignia. Established in 1988, they were granted a Royal Warrant as Medallists to Elizabeth II in 2008. Working with the Ministry of Defence to assist in the licensing of the production of medals, they became the first company to be granted such a licence in 2004.

On 1 December 2011 the UK Government announced that they had awarded the contract to manufacture the Queen Elizabeth II Diamond Jubilee Medal to Worcestershire Medal Service Ltd. Around 450,000 medals were manufactured in their UK factory for presentation to Armed Forces and Emergency Services personnel in 2012.

Today they are the approved manufacturers of all insignia issued by St James's Palace which includes the George Cross, George Medal and the Queen's Gallantry Medal.  In May 2018, the company was awarded the contract to manufacture all medals issued by the UK Ministry of Defence including all Military Gallantry, Campaign and Long and Meritorious Service Medals. A historic move away from the Royal Mint who had manufactured these awards for over 200 years. This includes all gallantry awarded to HM Armed Forces Conspicuous Gallantry Cross, Distinguished Service Cross, Military Cross, Distinguished Flying Cross and Air Force Cross. The company also produce the Elizabeth Cross.

As well as providing insignia to governments around the world, they also provide the largest selection of UK miniature and replacement medals.

See also 
Elizabeth Cross

References 

"Birmingham medal company fights for MoD contract to produce the Elizabeth Cross". Birmingham Post. 30 July 2009.

External links 
Worcestershire Medal Service Website
Royal Warrant Holders Association
BBC announcement of diamond jubilee contract

British Royal Warrant holders